Adventure is a 1946 American romantic drama film directed by Victor Fleming and starring Clark Gable and Greer Garson. Based on the 1937 novel The Anointed by Clyde Brion Davis, the film is about a sailor who falls in love with a librarian. Adventure was Gable's first postwar film and the tagline repeated in the movie's famous trailer was "Gable's back and Garson's got him!" Gable had suggested "He put the arson in Garson," while Garson proposed "She put the able in Gable."

Plot
When his ship is torpedoed by a Japanese submarine, Harry Patterson (Clark Gable), a World War II merchant marine boatswain, is cast adrift on a launch with a few of his shipmates. While Harry remains calm in the face of disaster, his friend Mudgin (Thomas Mitchell) prays desperately, promising to avoid women, liquor, and fighting and to donate money to the church if they are saved. Harry finds Mudgin's pleas ridiculous, but no sooner does Mudgin complete his pact with God than a rescue plane appears on the horizon and the men are saved.

They are then deposited in San Francisco where they engage in "R&R" care, grooming, dinners, and fun to celebrate their rescue. Mudgin quickly breaks all his promises to God soon after and becomes depressed, certain that he has "lost his immortal soul."

Mudgin's shipmates laugh off his concerns, but Harry realizes that Mudgin is truly wracked with guilt and they take a walk, arriving at the city library, because Mudgin and Harry think there may be some helpful information on the subject of the human soul there.

Here, Harry and Mudgin meet the attractive, strait-laced librarian Emily Sears (Greer Garson). Although intrigued by Emily, Harry repeatedly angers her with his wiseguy remarks and inappropriate behavior. However, his attention turns swiftly to her outgoing roommate, Helen Melohn (Joan Blondell), who has stopped in to walk her home. Harry and Helen decide to go on a date and convince a reluctant Emily to join them. At the restaurant, Emily stuns Harry when she abandons her reserved demeanor and joins a bar fight. Astounded, Harry decides to pursue Emily's affections and arranges to meet the two women the following day to visit Emily's farm outside the city.

Charmed by Emily and her family farmhouse which includes the big bed in which she was born, Harry and Emily soon fall completely in love and get married in Reno in a wild expression of love of life. However, upon their return to her farm, he tells Emily that he will be shipping out in a few days, which comes as a shock to Emily, who promptly asks for a divorce, insisting that she is just being a free spirit and giving Harry his freedom, as the best expression of love. Harry sails away, and Emily and pals go back to Reno for the quick divorce. But in Reno, with "the girls", Emily faints - the doctor called declares that she is pregnant with Harry's child.

While docked in a South American port city, Mudgin falls off the ship and claims, before dying in Harry's arms, that his soul has been returned to him.  A wise elderly gentleman, a friend (whose son died in the ship disaster at the film's start), gives Harry a good talking to when Harry complains about his relationship with Emily.

Nine months after his departure, now ready to commit to love and marriage, Harry comes back to San Francisco and finds out from Helen that Emily has long since given up on him and went to her farm to give birth to his child - insisting the baby born in the same bed she was.

Harry follows and arrives just as Emily goes into labor, so the meeting and reunion are brief - there is just time to give Emily reason to hope in improvements in Harry's character; he shares sad news of Mudgin's death, but it was peaceful and happy because Mudgin says his soul returned and he'd now go to heaven.

Waiting, Harry paces outdoors with Emily upstairs in labor, until Helen calls him in saying that Emily is fine and that he has a little boy, but there is trouble.

Harry races upstairs to the room across the bedroom set up to see to the baby. The child is stillborn, in spite of the efforts of Doctor, nurses and aide and Harry positions himself at the Doctor's side and won't be moved.   The Doctor finally gives up trying to get the baby to breathe, sadly turning away, but then Harry moves in and crying, calls desperately to the baby to breathe, breathe - for him, for his mother - whatever - but breathe. And we have the miracle as the little chest rises and the child's triumphant howl is astoundingly heard.

In the hall, happy tearful Helen hugs Harry as he races back across to Emily's side, thrilled to hear their baby, but she says she is just as moved to have heard Harry and his passion to save the child - finally honest caring sentiment. They decide to call the baby Mudgin, after their lost friend, and the film closes as Harry and Emily share a tender kiss, with baby's joyful cries in the background.

Cast
 Clark Gable as Harry Patterson 
 Greer Garson as Emily Sears 
 Joan Blondell as Helen Melohn 
 Thomas Mitchell as Mudgin 
 Tom Tully as Gus 
 John Qualen as Model T 
 Richard Haydn as Limo 
 Lina Romay as Maria 
 Philip Merivale as "Old" Ramon Estado 
 Harry Davenport as Dr. Ashlon 
 Tito Renaldo as "Young" Ramon Estado
 Pierre Watkin as Mr. Buckley (uncredited)
 Betty Blythe as Mrs. Buckley (uncredited)

Reception
According to MGM records, the film earned $4,236,000 in the US and Canada and $1,848,000 elsewhere resulting in a profit of $478,000.

References

External links
 
 
 
 

1946 films
1946 romantic drama films
American romantic drama films
American black-and-white films
1940s English-language films
Films based on American novels
Films directed by Victor Fleming
Films scored by Herbert Stothart
Metro-Goldwyn-Mayer films
1940s American films